Berri, South Australia  is a town and locality in South Australia.

Berri, South Australia may also refer to.

Berri Oval, a cricket oval in South Australia
Berri Football Club, Australian rules club in South Australia
District Council of Berri, former local government area in South Australia

See also
Berri (disambiguation)